William Plain (11 March 1868 – 14 October 1961) was a Scottish-born Australian politician.

Born in Scotland, to James and Christina (née Naismith) Plain, where he was educated, he migrated to Australia in 1890, where he became a farm worker and gold miner at Lara, Victoria. In 1908, he was elected to the Victorian Legislative Assembly as the Labor member for Geelong. He was also President of the Board of Land and Works and Commissioner of Crown Lands and Survey in 1913, as well as Minister for Water Supply and Agriculture. He left the Labor Party in the wake of the 1916 split over conscription, joining the Nationalist Party.

In 1917, he left the Assembly to contest the Australian Senate as a Nationalist candidate for Victoria. He was defeated in 1922, but was re-elected in 1925; he was appointed early to the Senate after the death of Edward Russell. Plain served as Chairman of Committees from 1926 to 1932. In 1931 he joined the new United Australia Party. He was defeated in 1937 and died on 14 October 1961 at Geelong. Plain was buried in the Presbyterian section at the Geelong Western Cemetery with his sister Elizabeth, who had died in 1960. Plain's wife Anna, who died in 1969 and their son Norman, who died in 1977 were subsequently buried in the same grave.

References

1868 births
1961 deaths
Nationalist Party of Australia members of the Parliament of Australia
United Australia Party members of the Parliament of Australia
Members of the Australian Senate for Victoria
Members of the Australian Senate
Members of the Victorian Legislative Assembly
Australian Labor Party members of the Parliament of Victoria
20th-century Australian politicians
Victorian Ministers for Agriculture